Guaraqueçaba is the easternmost municipality in the Brazilian state of Paraná, and one of the few coastal municipalities of the state. The short Ararapira River marks the border with São Paulo.

Guaraqueçaba has historical significance, being among the first Portuguese settlements in the state of Paraná in 1545.

In 1938 the municipality of Guaraqueçaba was abolished and its territory was absorbed into that of Paranaguá. However, in 1947 Guaraqueçaba had it municipal rights restored.

Conservation

The municipality contains the  Salto Morato Private Natural Heritage Reserve, created in 1994.
It contains the  Sebuí Private Natural Heritage Reserve, created in 1999.
It contains the Guaraqueçaba Ecological Station in the coastal mangrove area.
It also holds 53% of the  Bom Jesus Biological Reserve, a strictly protected conservation unit established in 2012.

References

External links

Populated coastal places in Paraná (state)
Populated places established in 1545
1947 establishments in Brazil
Municipalities in Paraná